The House at 305 E. Ashley in Siloam Springs, Arkansas is a high-quality local example of Queen Anne Victorian architecture.  Built c. 1900, it is a two-story wood-frame structure, with asymmetrical massing that includes beveled corners, projecting polygonal bay sections, and a pyramidal roof topped with a metal crest.  It is finished in novelty siding, with pilastered corner boards, and has a wraparound porch with simple columns.

The house was listed on the National Register of Historic Places in 1988.

See also
National Register of Historic Places listings in Benton County, Arkansas

References

Houses on the National Register of Historic Places in Arkansas
Houses completed in 1900
Houses in Siloam Springs, Arkansas
National Register of Historic Places in Benton County, Arkansas